Miguel Méndez (1930–2013) was a Mexican American author.

Miguel Méndez is also the name of:

Miguel Méndez (legal scholar) (c. 1943–2017), Professor of Law
Miguel Abadía Méndez (1867–1947), former President of Colombia